Nationality words link to articles with information on the nation's poetry or literature (for instance, Irish or France).

Events
February 16 - Julije Balović completes transcription of Junije Palmotić's drama Danica to which he appends three poems of unknown authors, including "Blind man sings of love events".
November - Nahum Tate becomes Poet Laureate of England.

Works published
 Richard Ames:
 The Double Descent, published anonymously
 The Jacobite Conventicle, published anonymously
 Sylvia's Complaint, of Her Sexes Unhappiness, anonymous reply to Robert Gould's Love Given O're of 1682 (see also Sylvia's Revenge 1688)
 Richard Baxter, translator, Paraphrase on the Psalms of David
 John Crowne, translator, The Daeneids, translation of Le Lutrin from the original French of Boileau
 John Dennis, Poems in Burlesque, published anonymously
 John Dryden, Eleonora, an elegy in honor of the Countess of Abingdon, whom he'd never seen, written for a lucrative fee; one of Dryden's most easygoing critics, Sir Walter Scott, called it "totally deficient of interest", and Mark Van Doren described it as a "catalogue of female Christian virtues, virtues which Dryden was not much moved by. It suffers from a threadbare piety everywhere except at the end [...]"
 Thomas Fletcher, Poems on Several Occasions, and Translations, in his preface, the author condemned rhyme in poetry
 Charles Gildon, editor, Miscellany Poems upon Several Occasions, anthology
 Matthew Prior, An Ode in Imitation of the Second Ode of the Third Book of Horace
 William Walsh, Letters and Poems, amorous and Gallant, published anonymously

Births
Death years link to the corresponding "[year] in poetry" article:
 February 29 - John Byrom (died 1763), English poet
 November 6 - Louis Racine (died 1763), French poet
 November 21 - Carlo Innocenzo Frugoni (died 1768), Italian poet
 Li E (died 1752), Chinese poet

Deaths
Birth years link to the corresponding "[year] in poetry" article:
 September 21 - Ermes di Colorêt (born 1622), Friulian courtier and poet
 November 19 - Thomas Shadwell (born c. 1642), English poet and playwright, Poet Laureate from 1689

See also

 Poetry
 17th century in poetry
 17th century in literature

Notes

17th-century poetry
Poetry